Testis-specific chromodomain protein Y 1 is a protein that in humans is encoded by the CDY1 gene.

This gene encodes a protein containing a chromodomain and a histone acetyltransferase catalytic domain. Chromodomain proteins are components of heterochromatin-like complexes and can act as gene repressors. This protein is localized to the nucleus of late spermatids where histone hyperacetylation takes place. Histone hyperacetylation is thought to facilitate the transition in which protamines replace histones as the major DNA-packaging protein. The human chromosome Y has two identical copies of this gene within a palindromic region; this record represents the more telomeric copy. Chromosome Y also contains a pair of closely related genes in another more telomeric palindrome as well as several related pseudogenes. Two protein isoforms are encoded by transcript variants of this gene. Additional transcript variants have been described, but their full-length nature has not been determined. The gene is thought to be related to high-altitude adaptation in humans.

References

External links

Further reading